Eddy Puyol (born July 4, 1979), who previously recorded under the name Rawsrvnt, is an American Christian hip hop artist, speaker, songwriter, and producer. He has released six studio albums, five extended plays, several singles, and a few compilation albums with greatest hits.

Early life
Puyol  (pronounced "pooh-yole") was born on July 4, 1979, in Miami, Florida. He has two younger siblings, a sister, Sofia, and a brother, Roberto ("Bobby"). His parents, Orlando and Susana (née, Smith), are both immigrants from Cuba. They own and operate a learning center for children. Puyol was raised Catholic and later converted to Protestantism.

Music career

Puyol first came to national prominence as Rawsrvnt in 2006 with his In Rare Form album. The project leaned heavy on hip hop-influenced covers and interpretations of popular praise songs and established the artist as a leader in the burgeoning worship space of the rap market. UK-based website Cross Rhythms called the effort "the best ever fusion of hip hop and worship ministry" and noted that it was "the benchmark for all future rappers seeking to get beyond dissing demons and the evangelism-by-numbers content of much holy hip hop."

As In Rare Form continued to empower church leaders to incorporate more hip hop styles into their Sunday morning services, one of Christian music's largest annual tours, Winter Jam Tour Spectacular, hired Puyol to craft a theme song for their 2009 traveling showcase. According to Rapzilla.com, Winter Jam was the fourth ranked tour on Pollstar's 2008 First Quarter Ticket Sales Chart topping Hannah Montana/Miley Cyrus, The Police, and Foo Fighters. The song was used for the next three years, and opened the door for additional hip hop artists like Lecrae to be featured on the tour.

In 2011, Puyol's No Ordinary Love album found its way on to the entry list for Best Gospel Album of the 54th Grammy Awards. The project featured the Top 40 Billboard hit "On Fire."

Later that year he was invited to be a featured player on The Story Tour alongside some of Christian music's biggest names like Steven Curtis Chapman, Michael Tait, Newsboys, and Natalie Grant. The partnership lasted through 2013 and provided an opportunity for the artist to perform as part of The Story Tour medley segment on the nationally televised 43rd Annual GMA Dove Awards.

Expanding his sound in 2012, Puyol created a hybrid EP with Jamaican reggae star St. Matthew titled Soul Deep. The project carried the momentum of one of its key tracks, "The Almighty," and won the 2012 En Sound Music Award for Best Gospel Reggae Song.

Since then his music has impacted people's lives in a variety of ways. From the personal (a Netherlands couple danced down the wedding aisle to his "I Gotta Feeling/Take It All" mashup) to the public (the same song was used by DJ Promote to warm up crowds on platinum-selling artist Chris Tomlin's "Burning Lights" tour), it seems there's always a will and a way for Puyol's art to connect with people in every walk of life.

Popular culture

In 2010, Eddy Puyol was cast on Donald J. Trump Presents The Ultimate Merger reality television dating show. The invitation to participate as a potential suitor for Omarosa Manigault came after the show's producers contacted Rapzilla.com looking for eligible bachelors with a unique look and story.

In response to criticism about his motivation for participating in the show, Puyol told the Houston Chronicle "Honestly, Christians have a hard time with this. I thought it would be cool to show what a real one looks like and how he approaches dating."

Eddy was eliminated in the third episode after having a one-on-one conversation with Omarosa in which he declared "I'm in love with Jesus, off top."

Sports connections

Because many of Puyol's songs are known for their high-energy vibe backed by positive and motivational lyrics, his music is often sought-ought by sports organizations to be used in conjunction with their promotions, telecasts, and competitions. Highlights include performances at Miami Heat superstar Dwyane Wade's birthday brunch, NASCAR driver Michael McDowell (racing driver) selecting "On Fire" for his track introduction, the Miami Dolphins using "Game Changer" as the theme for their weekly coaches show, and ESPN licensing "There Go That Man" for their 2017 NBA Finals and 2017 NBA Draft coverage.

Personal life
Puyol married Chrissy Alvarez on July 19, 2014. They have two daughters.

In July 2018, Puyol revealed that, although there were attempts made alongside church mentors and counselors, the couple ultimately could not reconcile their relationship and marital divorce proceedings were underway.

The couple divorced on March 18, 2020.

On March 11, 2023 Puyol married Corinne Johnson. They have a blended family of six with the addition of Corinne's son and daughter.

Discography
Studio albums

EPs

Singles

Compilation albums

References

External links
 Official website
 Rapzilla interview

1979 births
Living people
American performers of Christian music
Musicians from Miami
Songwriters from Florida